Burgo de Osma-Ciudad de Osma is the third-largest municipality in the province of Soria, in the autonomous community of Castile and León, Spain. It has a population of about 5,250.

It is made up of two parts:
the smaller Ciudad de Osma (city of Osma) to the west of the river Ucero, which flows southwards to the river Duero; and
the larger El Burgo de Osma (the borough of Osma, sometimes just called El Burgo) to the east of the river Ucero, the cathedral town of the province.

Osma derives from the Celto-Roman Uxama, while Burgo is cognate to the English word borough.

History
Burgo de Osma is well-known for its cultural heritage that includes the Burgo de Osma Cathedral, the University of Santa Catalina, the Castle, Plaza Mayor and Hospital de San Agustín (baroque architecture) and the Holy Week parade.

See also

 Uxama Argaela

References 

Municipalities in the Province of Soria
Cultural tourism in Spain